Bills C-1 and S-1 are pro forma bills introduced in the House of Commons and Senate respectively at the opening of each session of the Parliament of Canada.  The bills are given a first reading and are then never proceeded with further.  Being pro forma pieces of legislation, introducing them is mostly a formal tradition.  They are introduced each session in the Commons and Senate for the purpose of reasserting the right of Members to depart from the reasons for summoning Parliament contained in the Speech from the Throne and to proceed with such business before considering the Speech, therefore signifying Parliament's freedom from the direction of the Crown of Canada.

History
The introduction of a pro forma bill is a practice that has existed since before Confederation.  It originated in the English House of Commons in 1558.  As in the current Canadian practice, the bill in the English (later British) House was meant to show that the House could choose in which order to conduct its business regardless of what was in the throne speech.  Originally, a normal bill was used for this purpose, but in 1727 the House began to use a pro forma bill called the Outlawries Bill for this specific purpose.

In the House, Bill C-1 is normally introduced by the prime minister and is titled An Act respecting the Administration of Oaths of Office.  In the Senate, Bill S-1 is titled An Act relating to Railways. The two differ only in title, and their text does not concern railways or oaths of office.

Bill C-1 was ordered printed on January 26, 2009, in the second session of the 40th Parliament, possibly for the first time. In previous sessions of Parliament, it seems the bill was not ordered printed. As a result, the text of Bill C-1 is available on the Parliament of Canada website, although it is not available for any previous session. Bill S-1 is also available.

2009 text
Where bills C-1 and S-1 differ in wording, this is indicated with angle brackets as follows: .

See also
Outlawries Bill, traditional first bill in the British House of Commons
Select Vestries Bill, traditional first bill in the British House of Lords

References

External links 
Bill C-1
Bill S-1

Canadian federal legislation
Canadian traditions